Simeon "Sam" Millington was an English footballer who played as a goalkeeper during the 1920s and 1930s, mainly for Chelsea.

Millington joined Chelsea in January 1926 from non-league Wellington and was the club's first-choice goalkeeper for the next six seasons. He helped them win promotion back to the First Division, but ultimately lost his place in the side to the up-and-coming Vic Woodley, retiring at the end of the 1932/3 season.

He also made a non-speaking cameo appearance in the 1930 film, The Great Game, alongside ex-Chelsea star Jack Cock and teammates George Mills and Andy Wilson.

Year of birth missing
Year of death missing
Chelsea F.C. players
English footballers
Association football goalkeepers